Zappe is a surname. Notable people with the surname include:

Bailey Zappe (born 1999), American football player
Magdaléna Zappe (1757–1819), Austrian actress and dancer

See also
Zappe Boarding House, building on the US National Register of Historic Places in Ferriday, Louisiana